Radostina Todorova (born 14 April 1995) is a Bulgarian model and beauty pageant titleholder who was appointed as Miss Universe Bulgaria 2015 and represented Bulgaria at the Miss Universe 2015 pageant.

Personal life
Todorova is an athlete and model in Sofia. In 2014, she was crowned Miss National Team Bulgaria, representing Vratsa.

Appointment
On 28 October 2015 Todorova was appointed as Miss Universe Bulgaria 2015 by Mega Talent Group, the franchise holders for Miss Universe in Bulgaria. The pageant was not held due to lack of time in organizing the pageant.

On 20 December 2015 Todorova competed in the Miss Universe 2015 pageant. She failed to place in the semi-finals.

References

External links
Miss Universe Bulgaria Official Website

Living people
Bulgarian female models
Bulgarian beauty pageant winners
Miss Universe 2015 contestants
1995 births
People from Vratsa